George Frederick Braund (13 July 1866 – 4 May 1915) was an Australian soldier and politician.

Life
Braund was born in Bideford, Devon, England and was educated at Bideford Grammar School and migrated with his family to New South Wales, when he was 15. In 1889 his family moved to Armidale.

In 1893, Braund was commissioned second lieutenant in the Armidale company, 4th Australian Infantry Regiment and promoted to captain in 1899, major in 1912 and lieutenant-colonel in 1914.  He was a magistrate and for many years was president of the Armidale Chamber of Commerce. Braund was elected as a member of the New South Wales Legislative Assembly in 1913, representing Armidale for the Liberal Party.

War service
With the outbreak of the Great War and the creation of the Australian Imperial Force, Braund was appointed to raise and train the 2nd Infantry Battalion and he became its commander in August 1914.  He was the first member of an Australian parliament to enlist in the war.  On 25 April 1915, the first day of the landing at Anzac Cove, he landed with his troops and under sustained fire took and held a vital but isolated position.  After midnight on 4 May, while returning to brigade headquarters, he took a short cut through scrub and apparently failed to hear a challenge from a sentry, who then shot him dead.  He was one of only two serving Australian members of parliament to die in the Great War.

Braund was survived by a wife, two sons and a daughter.

Honours
He was posthumously mentioned in dispatches. On 30 November 1915 in the New South Wales Legislative Assembly the Speaker unveiled a commemorative tablet in honour of Braund and Sergeant Edward Larkin, the Member for Willoughby who also fell at Gallipoli. The plaque reads:

Notes

 

1866 births
1915 deaths
Members of the New South Wales Legislative Assembly
Australian colonels
British emigrants to Australia
Australian military personnel killed in World War I